The Reno Open was a golf tournament on the LPGA Tour in 1953 and 1957. It was played in Reno, Nevada.

Winners
1957 Betsy Rawls
1954–56 No tournament
1953 Patty Berg

References

Former LPGA Tour events
Golf in Nevada
Sports in Reno, Nevada
1953 establishments in Nevada
1957 disestablishments in Nevada
Recurring sporting events established in 1953
Recurring sporting events disestablished in 1957
History of women in Nevada